Lorient is a railway station in Lorient, Brittany, France. The station was opened on 26 September 1862 is located on the Savenay–Landerneau railway. Today, the station is served by TGV (high speed), Intercités (long distance) and TER (local) services operated by the SNCF.

Train services

The station is served by high speed trains to Quimper and Paris, and regional trains to Quimper, Vannes, Nantes and Rennes.

References

Lorient
Railway stations in Morbihan
TER Bretagne
Railway stations in France opened in 1862